David Merdy (born 19 December 1975 in France) is a French retired footballer.

References

French footballers
Living people
Association football forwards
1975 births
Stade Rennais F.C. players
ES Troyes AC players
ASOA Valence players
Wasquehal Football players